Almurfe is one of 15 parishes (administrative divisions)  in Belmonte de Miranda, a municipality within the province and autonomous community of Asturias, in northern Spain. 

Location
Almurfe is located between the towns of Almurfe, Aguasmestas, Bustiasmal and La Casilla.

The village of Almurfe, with 31 inhabitants, is about 13 kilometers from Belmonte. It is located on the River Pigüeña, about 400 meters above sea level and is accessed by the AS-227.

Villages
 Almurfe
 Auguasmestas
 Bustiasmal
 La Casilla

Feasts
The main celebration of the town is on the third Sunday in August.

References

Parishes in Belmonte de Miranda